The Royal Show, also known as the Royal Agricultural Show, was an annual agricultural show/fair held by the Royal Agricultural Society of England every year from 1839 to 2009. The event encompassed all aspects of farming, food and rural life - from the best of British livestock to the latest business and technological innovations in the farming industry. Over 1,000 stands, world-class livestock and equine classes attracted visitors from over 100 countries.

The Royal Show gave the name; Park Royal to the part of west London which once hosted the show. The Royal Agricultural Society of England had planned to make the site a permanent home for the Royal Show.  It was not a success and the Society sold the land in 1907. Indirectly, the show also provided the name of the Kansas City Royals baseball team, which was named for that city's American Royal show, named after the Royal Show.

History

On the road from 1839 to 1902 
Between 1839 and 1902 the Royal Show was held at various locations across the country:

Park Royal from 1903 to 1905 

Following the 1879 event at Queen's Park, which incurred a large financial loss due to bad weather, the Royal Agricultural Society made the decision to look for a permanent showground, in order to reduce costs and make additional income from letting the site for other events. Eventually a  site was leased near Twyford Abbey in West London, and given the name Park Royal by the society, a name it continues to bear. The first show was held on the site in 1903.

The attendances at the 1903 show were disappointing, and even worse at the shows in the two following years. By then it was decided that the idea of a permanent show had been a mistake, and that the travelling show should resume. The show grounds were sold for industrial use in 1907.

Back on the road from 1906 to 1962

Stoneleigh Park from 1963 to 2006 
From 1963, the Royal Show was held in Stoneleigh Park (previously known as the National Agricultural Centre or NAC) near Stoneleigh in Warwickshire, England. The first show at Stoneleigh lasted four days and attracted 111,916 visitors.

The 2007 show 
More than 140,000 visitors were expected to attend the 2007 show; however, bad weather forced the show to close early for the first time in its history. Torrential rains left the showground saturated and police and show organisers took the decision to close the show a day ahead of schedule "to ensure the safety and welfare of the public, traders and exhibitors".

Two of the showground's car parks were closed on Monday evening after drivers had to be towed free. A further  of barley and hay fields were mown to provide additional parking on the Tuesday.

The decision was described as "heartbreaking" by the Royal Agricultural Society of England. John Moverley, RASE Chief Executive, said the financial implications of the wet weather and closing the show early were being assessed. "We haven’t got exact figures, but it looks as though we are down by about 10% for the first two days on last year," he said.

The end 
The Royal Show was again run at Stoneleigh in 2008. However, on 3 April 2009, organisers said the 2009 show would be the last.

The Agricultural Buildings Show has taken over in part from the Royal Show at Stoneleigh Park.

See also
Royal Welsh Show largest agricultural show in Europe

References

External links

Official website
Royal Show 2007 Event Report

Agricultural shows in England
Culture in Warwickshire
1839 establishments in England
2009 disestablishments in England
Fairs in the United Kingdom
Festivals established in 1839